Samuel Peter Acosta Larsen (born August 28, 1991) is an American actor and singer. On August 21, 2011, Larsen won the reality competition program The Glee Project on the Oxygen network, which led to his having a recurring role as Joe Hart on the Fox television show Glee. Larsen was also a member of the band Bridges I Burn.

He is pursuing his solo career, and released his debut EP, Vices, on October 27, 2014.

Life and career
Larsen was born in San Francisco, to Henrik and Lupe Acosta Larsen. His father is from Denmark and his mother from Mexico. Larsen has an older brother, Manolo Acosta, and a sister named Morgan. As a young boy, Larsen played drums, bass, guitar and keyboards. He graduated from Murrieta Valley High School in 2009. In his sophomore year, he became vocalist and guitarist of the school band 15 North and the band performed in festivals.

In 2010, Larsen auditioned in season 9 of American Idol but was cut after making it to Hollywood, failing to make it to the semi-finals. After doing some runway modeling for fashion designer Ashton Michael, he met his soon-to-be bandmate Skip Arnold during a runway show, moved to Los Angeles busking and applied to The Glee Project. Meanwhile, Larsen and Skip Arnold formed the band "Bridges I Burn" and soon a third member, Salvatore Spinelli, joined them. Larsen writes and performs most of his music. He spent some time touring with the rock band Palaye Royale in 2017–2018. He auditioned for the role of Sam Evans on Glee but did not get the part, which went to Chord Overstreet.

His first Glee appearance was on the thirteenth episode of the third season, titled "Heart", as Joe Hart, a formerly home-schooled Christian. During that episode he performed in two songs: Gym Class Heroes' "Stereo Hearts", and a mashup of The Association's "Cherish" and Madonna's "Cherish". Although his prize for having won The Glee Project was seven episodes, he appeared in each of the final ten episodes of Glee third season. In addition, he appeared as a mentor for The Glee Project second season, appeared in 12 episodes in Glee fourth season, and appeared twice in the final season.
In July 2018, Larsen was cast as Zed Evans in the film adaptation of Anna Todd's bestselling novel After. The film was released on 12 April 2019. Larsen plays the role again in its 2020 sequel After We Collided.

Discography
 Pocket Love (2012)
 3 Blind Costumes (2013)
 Vices - EP (2014)
 Education - Single (2016)
 You Should Know (2016)
 Blue - Single (2017)

Filmography

Television

Film

2022 
Beautiful Disaster Movie
Jesse Viveros

References

External links
 
 Bridges I Burn Facebook page
 Bridges I Burn YouTube page

1991 births
Living people
Participants in American reality television series
Reality casting show winners
American male television actors
21st-century American male actors
American people of Danish descent
American male actors of Mexican descent
21st-century American singers
21st-century American male singers